Prunus cerasus (sour cherry, tart cherry, or dwarf cherry) is a species of Prunus in the subgenus Cerasus (cherries), native to much of Europe and southwest Asia. It is closely related to the sweet cherry (Prunus avium), but has a fruit that is more acidic. Its sour pulp is edible.

The tree is smaller than the sweet cherry (growing to a height of 4–10 m), has twiggy branches, and its crimson-to-near-black cherries are borne upon shorter stalks. There are two main varieties (groups of cultivars) of the sour cherry: the dark-red Morello cherry and the lighter-red Amarelle cherry.

Origins and cultivation

Prunus cerasus, a tetraploid with 2n=32 chromosomes, is thought to have originated as a natural hybrid between Prunus avium and Prunus fruticosa in the Iranian Plateau or Eastern Europe where the two species come into contact. Prunus fruticosa is believed to have provided its smaller size and sour tasting fruit. The hybrids then stabilized and interbred to form a new, distinct species.

Cultivated sour cherries were selected from wild specimens of Prunus cerasus and the doubtfully distinct P. acida from around the Caspian and Black Seas, and were known to the Greeks in 300 BC. They were also extremely popular with Persians and the Romans who introduced them into Britain long before the 1st century AD The fruit remains popular in modern-day Iran.

In England, their cultivation was popularized in the 16th century in the time of Henry VIII. They became a popular crop amongst Kentish growers, and by 1640 over two dozen named cultivars were recorded.

Before the Second World War there were more than fifty cultivars of sour cherry in cultivation in England; today, however, few are grown commercially, and despite the continuation of named cultivars such as 'Kentish Red', 'Amarelles', 'Griottes' and 'Flemish', only the generic Morello is offered by most nurseries. This is a late-flowering variety, and thus misses more frosts than its sweet counterpart and is therefore a more reliable cropper. The Morello cherry ripens in mid to late summer, toward the end of August in southern England. It is self-fertile, and would be a good pollenizer for other varieties if it did not flower so late in the season.

Sour cherries require similar cultivation conditions to pears, that is, they prefer a rich, well-drained, moist soil, although they demand more nitrogen and water than sweet cherries. Trees will do badly if waterlogged, but have greater tolerance of poor drainage than sweet varieties. As with sweet cherries, Morellos are traditionally cultivated by budding onto strong growing rootstocks, which produce trees too large for most gardens, although newer dwarfing rootstocks such as Colt and Gisella are now available. During spring, flowers should be protected, and trees weeded, mulched and sprayed with natural seaweed solution. This is also the time when any required pruning should be carried out (note that cherries should not be pruned during the dormant winter months). Morello cherry trees fruit on younger wood than sweet varieties, and thus can be pruned harder. They are usually grown as standards, but can be fan trained, cropping well even on cold walls, or grown as low bushes.

Sour cherries suffer fewer pests and diseases than sweet cherries, although they are prone to heavy fruit losses from birds. In summer, fruit should be protected with netting. When harvesting fruit, they should be cut from the tree rather than risking damage by pulling the stalks.

Unlike most sweet cherry varieties, sour cherries are self fertile or self pollenizing (sometimes inaccurately referred to as self-pollinating). Two implications of this are that seeds generally run true to the cultivar, and that much smaller pollinator populations are needed because pollen only has to be moved within individual flowers. In areas where pollinators are scarce, growers find that stocking beehives in orchards improves yields.

Some cultivars of sour cherry trees, such as Montmorency and North Star, have been documented to perform better than other cherry trees in Colorado's Front Range region.

Uses

Culinary
Dried sour cherries are used in cooking including soups, pork dishes, cakes, tarts, and pies.  Also used to make a jam/fruit spread.

Sour cherries are particularly popular in Turkey, especially in the form of vişne suyu (sour cherry nectar), a widely-consumed beverage, and vişne reçeli (sour cherry jam), often eaten as part of a traditional kahvaltı (Turkish breakfast) or mixed into plain yoghurt.

Sour cherries or sour cherry syrup are used in liqueurs and drinks, such as the Romanian vișinată or the Portuguese ginjinha. In Iran, Turkey, Greece and Cyprus, sour cherries are prized for making spoon sweets by slowly boiling pitted sour cherries and sugar; the syrup thereof is used for sharbat-e Albalou, vişne şurubu or vyssináda, a beverage made by diluting the syrup with ice-cold water. A particular use of sour cherries is in the production of kriek lambic, a cherry-flavored variety of a naturally fermented beer made in Belgium.
In Germany and Austria sour cherries are often used for desserts such as the Donauwelle.

See also
 Fruit trees
 Fruit tree forms
 Fruit tree propagation
 Ginjinha, a Portuguese liqueur made from Sour Cherry
 Griotte de Kleparow
 Kirsch
 Kriek, a traditional Belgian beer made with sour cherries
 Marasca cherry (Prunus cerasus var. marasca)
 Amarena cherry (Prunus cerasus var. amarena)
 North Star cherry, a dwarf variety
 Pruning fruit trees
 Sour cherry soup
 Syzygium corynanthum, an Australian rainforest tree also known as the Sour cherry
 Vișinată, a Romanian liqueur made with sour cherries (vișina in Romanian)

References

External links
 
 
 
 
 

Cherries
Flora of Europe
Flora of Asia
Plants described in 1753
cerasus
Sour cherries
Sour cherry (Prunus cerasus)
Fruit trees
Taxa named by Carl Linnaeus